The following is a list of websites that follow a question-and-answer format. The list contains only websites for which an article exists, dedicated either wholly or at least partly to the websites.

For the humor "Q&A site" format first popularized by Forum 2000 and The Conversatron, see Q&A comedy website.

See also
 Comparison of civic technology platforms
 Comparison of Internet forum software
 List of Internet forums
 Knowledge market
 Q&A software – includes a comparison of self-hostable Q&A software

References

QandA
QandA